Witwen is an unincorporated community in the town of Troy, Sauk County, Wisconsin, United States.

The community was named for G. and J. P. Witwen, the operators of a local mill.

References

Unincorporated communities in Sauk County, Wisconsin
Unincorporated communities in Wisconsin